Karl Jensen (21 September 1898 – 28 July 1928) was a Danish athlete. He competed in the men's discus throw and the men's hammer throw at the 1924 Summer Olympics.

References

External links
 

1898 births
1928 deaths
Athletes (track and field) at the 1924 Summer Olympics
Danish male discus throwers
Danish male hammer throwers
Olympic athletes of Denmark
Place of birth missing